The High Sheriff of King's County was the British Crown's judicial representative in King's County (now County Offaly), Ireland, from 1556, when King's County was created, until 1922, when the office was abolished in the new Free State and replaced by the office of Offaly County Sheriff. The sheriff had judicial, electoral, ceremonial and administrative functions and executed High Court writs. In 1908, an Order in Council made the Lord-Lieutenant the sovereign's prime representative in a county and reduced the High Sheriff's precedence. However, the sheriff retained his responsibilities for the preservation of law and order in the county. The usual procedure for appointing the sheriff from 1660 onwards was that three persons were nominated at the beginning of each year from the county and the Lord Lieutenant then appointed his choice as High Sheriff for the remainder of the year. Often the other nominees were appointed as under-sheriffs. Sometimes a sheriff did not fulfil his entire term through death or other event and another sheriff was then appointed for the remainder of the year. The dates given hereunder are the dates of appointment. All addresses are in King's County (County Offaly) unless stated otherwise.

High Sheriffs of King's County
1656: Henry L'Estrange
1657: Sir George Blundell, 2nd Baronet
1662: Philip Bigoe
1663: Charles Lyons of River Lyons
1667: Thomas Wakely
1671: John Reading of Readingstown
1672: John Baldwin
1674: Jonathan Darby of Leap Castle
1680: Edward Bagot
 Robert Lovett
1693: Geoffrey Lyons of River Lyons
1694: James Sterling
1695: John Wakely of Ballyburly
1697: John Baldwin, jnr of Corolanty
1698: Hector Vaughan of Dromoyle and Knocknamease
1701: Richard Warburton of Garryhinch
1702: Geoffrey Lyons of River Lyons
1703: John Reading of Readingstown
1704: Geoffrey Lyons of River Lyons
1705: Francis Heaton of Mount Heaton
1707: Peter Holmes of Johnstown
1708:
1711: James Forth of Charleville Castle
1713: George Holmes of Liscloony
1715: Colley Lyons, MP, of River Lyons
1717: Benjamin Frend of Boskell, Co. Limerick and Ballyreehy
1720: Henry Malone of Litter
1721:
1726: Thomas Wakely of Ballyburly
1730: Edmund Armstrong
1731:
1738: Warenford Armstrong
1738: Hector Vaughan of Fancroft
1740: John Frend of Boskell, Co. Limerick and Ballyreehy
1741: Nicholas Biddulph of Fortal and Rath-Robin
1744: Henry Lyons of River Lyons
1750: Arthur Judge of Readingstown
1751: Andrew Armstrong
1752: George Fraser of Park and Cuba House
1753: 
1754: Peter Marsh of Moyally
1755: Francis Lumm, later Sir Francis Lumm, 1st Baronet of Lummville
1756:
1759: John O'Connor of Mount Pleasant

George III, 1760–1820
1763: John Wakely of Ballyburly
1764: Daniel Chenevix, of Ballycommon
1766: William Peisley Vaughan of Golden Grove
1768: John Minchin of Bushertown
1769:
1771: Gilbert Holmes of Belmont
1772: Owen Moony of Lackaghbeg
1774: Denis Bowes Daly
1777: Christopher Bor
1777: Andrew Armstrong of Castle Armstrong
1779: Sir William Parsons, 4th Baronet
1780: John Drought
1782: John King
1782: Benjamin Frend of Clooneen
1783: Maurice Nugent O'Connor
1784: James Frank Roleston of Dunkerrin
1785: Thomas Bernard, of Castle-Town
1786: John Warburton of Garryhinch
1787: Jonathan Darby of Leap Castle
1788:
1792: Thomas Ryder of Laughton
1793: William Carroll Moony of New Lawn, County Tipperary
1794: Robert James Enraght-Moony of The Doon
1796: John Wakely of Ballyburly
1798: Thomas Bernard of Castle Bernard
1799: Henry Verney Lovett Darby of Annvilla
1801: Richard Warburton of Garryhinch
1801: Joseph Studholme of Ballyeighan and Kilmaine
1802: Charles Baldwin
1803: Jackson Wray Atkinson of Cangort
1804: James Frank Rolleston of Frankfort Castle
1805: William Peasley Vaughan of Golden Grove
1806: Maunsell Andrews of Rathenny
1807: John Downing Nesbitt
1808: John Drought
1809: Thomas St George Armstrong of Garry Castle House
1810: George Arbuthnot Holmes of Moorock
1811: Sir Andrew Armstrong, Bt
1812: George Meares John Drought
1813: Humphrey Borr
1814: Henry Spunner
1815: George Marsh
1816: Thomas Homan Mulock of Bellair
1816: Henry Peisley l'Estrange, jnr of Moystown
1817: Richard Malone
1818: Edmund Armstrong
1819: Garrett O'Moore

George IV, 1820–1830
1820: Francis Moony Enragh-Moony of the Doon
1821: John Head Drought
1822: Thomas Hornan Molluck
1823: Benjamin Lucas
1824: George Minchin of Bushertown
1825: Lord Tullamore
1826: Sir Robert Waller, 2nd Baronet of Newport
1827: William H. Magan, Clocarl, Philipstown
1828: George Minchin of Bushertown

William IV, 1830–1837
1832: Francis Longworth-Dames of Greenhill
1834: John Tibeaudo, of Portnahinch, Portarlington
1835: Hector John Graham Toler, 3rd Earl of Norbury, of Durrow Abbey
1834: Sir Michael Cusac Smith of Newtown, Tullamore
1836: Sir Andrew Armstrong, Bt
1837: Thomas Bernard of Castle Bernard

Victoria, 1837–1901
1840: Henry Sandford Palmer of Ballinlough
1841: Garrett O'Moore of Cloghan Castle, Kinnitty
1842: Thomas Bernard of Castle Bernard
1844: Thomas Hackett of Moor Park
1845: Richard Warburton of Garryhinch.
1846: Guy Atkinson of Cangort
1848: Charles B. Baldwin of London
1849: Thomas Homan Mulock of Bellaire, Ballycottier.
1850: Edward John Corr, of Ballinolan, Ederderry
1852: John Gilbert King of Ballylinn, Ferbane
1853: John Wakely of Ballyburly
1854: Francis Valentine Bennett
1855: Robert James Enraght Moony of Mount Pleasant
1856: William G.D.Nesbitt of Thubberdaly House, Edenberry  
1857:
1858: James Drought of Banagher
1859: Thomas Seymour of Ballymore Castle, Galway
1860: Edward John Briscoe of Screggan
1861: Hon. Alfred Bury, later 5th Earl of Charleville
1862: Arthur Henry Nicholas Kemmis
1863: John Craven Westenra
1864:
1866: John Lloyd of Gloster
1867: Lawrence Parsons, 4th Earl of Rosse
1868: Captain Maxwell Fox of Annaghmore
1869: Thomas Longworth-Dames of Greenhill
1870: George John Minchin of Bushertown
1871: Bernard Daly of Hazlebrook, Dublin and Tullamore.
1872: Richard Warburton of Garryhinch.
1873: Captain Ambrose Clement Wolseley Cox.
1874: William Bassett Holmes of St David's.
1875: Peter Hamlet Thompson of Stonestown and Park.
1876: Marcus Goodbody of Inchmore
1877: Arthur Burdett of Coolfin.
1878: William Peisley Hutchinson-Lloyd-Vaughan of Golden Grove.
1879: John Sherlock of Rahan.
1880: William Grogan Graves of Cloghan Castle, Banagher.
1881:
1882: Henry Vincent Jackson of Inane.
1883: Jonathan Charles Darby of Leap castle, Roscrea.
1884: Kenneth Howard Bury.
1885: William Thomas Trench of Redwood, Co. Tipperary.
1886: William Kennedy Marshall of Baronne Court, Ormond Lower.
1887: Captain Caulfeild French of Castletehin, Roscommon and Castle Bernard, Kinnitty,
1888: Arthur Frederick Churchhill Tollemache of Ballincur.
1889: Capt. Thomas Armstrong Drought of Letty Brook, Kennitty.
1890:
1892: Edward John Downing Beaumont-Nesbitt of Tubberdaly.
1893: Hector Robert Graham Toler.
1894: James Perry Goodbody of Inchmore.
1895: William Bury Homan-Mulock of Bellair.
1896: Arthur Hugo Florian de Burdet Burdett of Ballymany, Co. Kildare and Coolfin.
1897: Bernard Daly of Dunboy.
1898:
1899: Turner Oliver Read of Dungar House, Roscrea, Tipperary
1900: George Austin Medlen of Lowlands, Roscrea, Tipperary.
1901:

Edward VII, 1901–1910
 1901: Lieut.-Col. Middleton West Biddulph of Rathrobin, King's Co.
 1902: Francis Berry Homan-Mulock of Ballycumber House.
 1903: Henry Louis King of Ballylin.
 1904: Christopher James Patrick Banon of Broughall Castle.
 1905: Henry Charles White of Charleville. (also High Sheriff of Queen's County)
 1906: John Hardress Lloyd of Gloster.
 1907: Sylvester Rait Kerr of Edenderry.
 1909: Launcelot Joseph Moore Studholme of Ballyeighan and Kilmaine.

George V, 1910–1936
1910: Valentine John Eustace Lenigan of Castle Ffogerty.
1911: Otway Scarlett Graham-Toler.
1914: Andrew Harvey Armstrong, 3rd Baronet.
1915:
1920: Georges Meares Stopford Enright-Moony.
1921: Charles Kenneth Howard-Bury.

References

 
King's County